Ratho is a dispersed rural community located in the township of Blandford-Blenheim in Oxford County in southwestern Ontario. Located in old Blandford Township, at its centre are the Ratho Presbyterian Cemetery, a church and an old general store.

History
The hamlet was named by its original settlers for Ratho, a village in the Rural West Edinburgh area of Edinburgh, Scotland.

Communities in Oxford County, Ontario